According to the Bible, Shelah/Shela was the youngest brother among Judah's first three sons, and was born at Chezib.

Biblical narrative
In the text, God had killed Shelah's two older brothers, Er and Onan. Judah was unwilling to allow Tamar, who had been successively Er's and Onan's wife, to be married to Shelah. Judah's concern was that Tamar might be cursed and Shelah might die if married to her. So Judah told her to wait until Shelah had grown up. When Shelah came of age, Judah neglected to marry him to Tamar. In the Book of Chronicles, Shelah is identified as the name of a clan, containing a subclan named Er.

The sons of Shelah the son of Judah were:
Er, the father of Lecah
Laadah, the father of Mareshah, and the families of the house of the linen workers of the house of Ashbea
Jokim, the men of Chozeba
Joash
Saraph, who ruled in Moab
Jashubi-Lehem
"These were the potters and those who dwell at Netaim and Gederah; there they dwelt with the king for his work."

According to biblical scholars, the description of Shelah is an eponymous aetiological myth concerning fluctuations in the constituency of the tribe of Judah, with Shelah representing the newest clan to become part of the tribe. The Book of Chronicles' description of Er as a descendant of Shelah, suggests that Er was in reality the name of a clan that was originally equal in status to the Shelah clan, but was later subsumed by it. 

Scholars have argued that the Tamar narrative, of which the description of Shelah is a part, secondarily aims to either assert the institution of levirate marriage, or present an aetiological myth for its origin; Shelah's role in the narrative would thus be as the example of a brother refusing to perform levirate marriage. John Emerton regards the evidence for this as inconclusive, though classical rabbinical writers argued that this narrative concerns the origin of levirate marriage.

Family Tree

Notes and citations

Book of Genesis people
Tribe of Judah